Triple metre (or Am. triple meter, also known as triple time) is a musical metre characterized by a primary division of 3 beats to the bar, usually indicated by 3 (simple) or 9 (compound) in the upper figure of the time signature, with , ,  and  being the most common examples. The upper figure being divisible by three does not of itself indicate triple metre; for example, a time signature of  usually indicates compound duple metre, and similarly  usually indicates compound quadruple metre.

Shown below are a simple and a compound triple drum pattern.

Stylistic differences
In popular music, the metre is most often quadruple, but this does not mean that triple metre does not appear. It features in a good amount of music by artists such as The Chipmunks, Louis Armstrong or Bob Dylan.

In jazz, this and other more adventurous metres have become more common since Dave Brubeck's album Time Out. One noteworthy example of a jazz classic that employs triple metre is John Coltrane's version of "My Favorite Things".

Triple time is common in formal dance styles, for example the sarabande, the minuet, the mazurka, the waltz and others.

Triple metre is rare in national anthems – the national anthems of Austria, the United Kingdom, Switzerland, and the United States being four notable exceptions.

Sources 

Time signatures